Sight is visual perception.

Sight or Sights may also refer to:
An object of sightseeing, a point of interest
Sight (device), used to assist aim by guiding the eye
Sighting in, adjusting firearms sights
Sight, an angular measurement in celestial navigation
Sight (Keller Williams video), a 2005 concert DVD by Keller Williams
The Sight (film), a 2000 American horror television film
"The Sight", a short story by Brian Moore
The Sight, a 1985 film based on the short story by Brian Moore
Sight (2008 film), a 2008 film
 Sight (upcoming film), an upcoming film starring Greg Kinnear
The Sight (Hunter novel), 2007 novel in the Warriors: Power of Three series by Erin Hunter
The Sight (Clement-Davies novel), a 2002 book about wolves by David Clement-Davies
The Sights, a band
"Sights", a song by London Grammar from the album If You Wait
Sight, a 2018 novel by Jessie Greengrass